The ALCO Century 420 is a four-axle,  diesel-electric locomotive. 131 were built between June 1963 and August 1968. Cataloged as a part of ALCO's "Century" line of locomotives, the C420 was intended to replace the earlier RS-32 model.

Original Owners 

Since 2005, roughly 30% of C420 production exists. All units ordered by Mississippi Export, New York, Chicago & St. Louis Railroad ("Nickel Plate"), and Piedmont & Northern Railway have been scrapped.

The two units delivered to the Piedmont & Northern were the first of the Phase II units.

Preservation 
 Lehigh Valley Railroad 405 is currently operating in Scranton, Pennsylvania, as Delaware Lackawanna Railroad 405.
 Lehigh Valley Railroad 408 is at the Southern Appalachia Railway Museum (Oak Ridge, Tennessee) as VLIX 2064.
 Lehigh Valley Railroad 414 is on the Delaware Lackawanna Railroad (Scranton, Pennsylvania).
 Long Island Rail Road 220 is at the Yucatan RR Museum as NdeM 220.
 Louisville & Nashville Railroad 1310 is at the Southern Appalachia Railway Museum (Oak Ridge, Tennessee).
 Louisville & Nashville Railroad 1315 is at the Southern Appalachia Railway Museum (Oak Ridge, Tennessee).
 NdeM 5700 is at the Yucatan RR Museum.
 Seaboard Air Line Railroad 124 is at the Cuyahoga Valley Scenic Railroad (Independence, Ohio) as their 365.
 Long Island Rail Road 213 is active on the Dakota Southern RR DS paint scheme, same number Mitchell, South Dakota. It has since been sold to the A&M and renumbered to 69.
 Livonia, Avon and Lakeville Railroad ex-DCLR, ESHR, VAMD, LIRR 200, currently in operation.

See also 
 List of ALCO diesel locomotives
 List of MLW diesel locomotives

References
 Preserved Alco and MLW-Built Centuries.  Retrieved on August 25, 2009

External links

 Sarberenyi, Robert. Alco C420 Original Owners.

B-B locomotives
Century 420
Diesel-electric locomotives of the United States
Railway locomotives introduced in 1963
Standard gauge locomotives of the United States
Standard gauge locomotives of Mexico